Callidium biguttatum is a species of beetle in the family Cerambycidae. It was described by Salé in 1865.

References

Callidium
Beetles described in 1865